Artūrs Matisons (born 6 May 1985 in Valmiera) is a Latvian cyclist. He has competed at the 2008 Summer Olympics in Beijing, specialized in BMX cycling.

Career bicycle motocross titles

Amateur/Junior Men
"2002 European Junior Elite Champion"

Union Cycliste Internationale (UCI)*
"2003 Junior Elite Men Gold Medal World Champion"
"2003 Junior Elite Cruiser Men Gold Medal World Champion"

Professional/Elite Men
"2007 Elite World #4"
"2006 European Elite Champion"
Union Cycliste Internationale (UCI)*
"2004 Elite World #14"
"2003 Junior Elite Cruiser Men Gold Medal World Champion"

References

External links
 matisons.com
 bmxlatvia.com - Latvian ELITE BMX website Personal Blogs, Gallery,video, results and more
 
 
 
 
 

1985 births
Living people
Latvian male cyclists
BMX riders
Olympic cyclists of Latvia
Cyclists at the 2008 Summer Olympics
People from Valmiera